Karin Peckert-Forsman (born 24 February 1905, date of death unknown) was an Estonian alpine skier. She competed in the women's combined event at the 1936 Winter Olympics. She was the first woman to represent Estonia at the Olympics.

References

1905 births
Year of death missing
Sportspeople from Tallinn
People from the Governorate of Estonia
Baltic-German people
Estonian female alpine skiers
Olympic alpine skiers of Estonia
Alpine skiers at the 1936 Winter Olympics